The following railroads operate in the U.S. state of Minnesota.

Common freight carriers
Airlake Terminal Railway (ALT)
BNSF Railway (BNSF)
Canadian National Railway (CN) including subsidiaries Cedar River Railroad (CEDR), Duluth, Missabe and Iron Range Railway (DMIR), Duluth, Winnipeg and Pacific Railway (DWP), Illinois Central Railroad and Wisconsin Central Ltd. (WC)
Canadian Pacific Railway (CP) through subsidiaries Dakota, Minnesota and Eastern Railroad (DME) and Soo Line Railroad (SOO)
Cloquet Terminal Railroad (CTRR)
Minnesota Commercial Railway (MNNR)
Minnesota, Dakota and Western Railway (MDW)
Minnesota Northern Railroad (MNN)
Minnesota Prairie Line, Inc. (MPLI)
Northern Lines Railway (NLR)
Northern Plains Railroad (NPR)
Otter Tail Valley Railroad (OTVR)
Progressive Rail, Inc. (PGR)
Red River Valley and Western Railroad (RRVW)
St. Croix Valley Railroad (SCXY)
Twin Cities and Western Railroad (TCWR)
Union Pacific Railroad (UP)

Private freight carriers
Cliffs Erie Railroad
Northshore Mining
US Steel

Passenger carriers
Amtrak (AMTK)
Lake Superior and Mississippi Railroad
METRO Light Rail
North Shore Scenic Railroad (NSSR)
Northstar Line (MNRX)
Osceola and St. Croix Valley Railway

Defunct railroads

Electric
Duluth Street Railway
Duluth–Superior Traction Company
Fargo and Moorhead Street Railway
Granite City Railway
Interstate Traction Company
Lakeside Railway
Lyndale Railway
Mankato Electric Traction Company
Mesaba Railway
Minneapolis and St. Paul Suburban Railroad
Minneapolis and St. Paul Suburban Railway
Minneapolis, Anoka and Cuyuna Range Railroad (MA&C, MACR)
Minneapolis, Anoka and Cuyuna Range Railway (MA&C)
Minneapolis, Lyndale and Lake Calhoun Railway
Minneapolis, Lyndale and Minnetonka Railway
Minneapolis Street Railway
Park Point Traction Company
St. Paul City Railway
St. Paul Southern Electric Railway
Superior Rapid Transit Railway
Twin City Rapid Transit Company
Wahpeton–Breckenridge Street Railway
Winnoa Railway and Light Company
Woodland Railway

Private
Itasca Lumber Company

Notes

References

 
 
Minnesota
Railroads